Hassan Abdulrahman (Arabic:حسن عبد الرحمن) (born 11 February 1989) is an Emirati footballer who plays for Hatta as a midfielder.

References

External links
 

Emirati footballers
1989 births
Living people
Al Ahli Club (Dubai) players
Dubai CSC players
Emirates Club players
Ajman Club players
Hatta Club players
Place of birth missing (living people)
UAE First Division League players
UAE Pro League players
Association football midfielders